The Salm is a  river in western Germany (Rhineland-Palatinate), a left-bank tributary to the river Moselle. It rises in the Eifel, near the village of Salm, south of Gerolstein. The Salm flows generally south, through Großlittgen, Dreis, and Salmtal. It passes west of Wittlich. It empties into the Moselle in Klüsserath.

See also 
List of rivers of Rhineland-Palatinate

Rivers of Rhineland-Palatinate
Rivers of the Eifel
Rivers of Germany